Recess Records is an independent record label founded in 1988.  Label founder Todd Congelliere (frontman for F.Y.P and Toys That Kill) initially made 100 cassettes of F.Y.P's songs and sold them at skateboard contests. Two years later, Congelliere released a vinyl record, F.Y.P's Extra Credit, an 11-song 7-inch record, and the label took off from there.

In between touring the U.S., Europe, and Japan, Congelliere began releasing records for fellow punk rock and DIY bands, eventually having a roster of close to 20 artists on his label. Pinhead Gunpowder, fronted by Green Day frontman Billie Joe Armstrong, announced in April 2008 that a new 7" single from the band would be released on Recess Records in late May 2008.

History
Recess started in a bedroom in Torrance, California in 1988. 
In 1995 Recess was moved out of the apartment into a warehouse. 
In 1997 Recess relocated to San Pedro, California (15 minutes away) and has been there ever since.
In 2008, Recess launched the Recess Japan branch of the label

Artists

Recess Records
The Arrivals
Audacity
The Bananas
 Beatnik Termites
 Ben Weasel
 Bent Outta Shape
 Berzerk
 Civic Minded Five
 The Criminals
 The Crumbs
 The Dwarves
 F.Y.P
 Fleshies
 Four Deadly Questions
 Four Letter Words
 Furious George
 The Grumpies
 I Spy
 Jag Offs
 Japanther
 Jon Cougar Concentration Camp
 Jumpstarted Plowhards
 The Modern Machines
 Off With Their Heads
 Propagandhi
 Pinhead Gunpowder
 Quincy Punx
 The Riverdales
 Screeching Weasel
 Sharkpants
 Summer Vacation
 Screaming Females
 Swing Ding Amigos
 Toys That Kill
 Treasure Fleet
 Tenement
 The Underground Railroad to Candyland

Recess Japan
Audacity
 Belly Button
 Brazil UFO
 Bust!
 The Cistems
 The Doodles
 Ffeeco Woman
 Fleshies
 Heart Shaped Hate
 The Mapes
 Nope Ople
 No People
 The Nowheres
 Peach Kelli Pop
 San Hose
 Seventeen Again
 Sharkpants
 The Sleeping Aides and Razorblades
 The Steadys
 Teenage Slang Session
 What The Kids Want
 The Underground Railroad to Candyland

See also
 List of record labels

References

External links
 Official site
 Mini-documentary by Mike Plante
 Recess Japan website
 Razorcake interview with Todd Congelliere
 Vice interview with Todd Congelliere

American independent record labels
Record labels established in 1989
Punk record labels
DIY culture